The 2011–12 season was the 137th season of competitive football in Wales.

Overview

Men's national team

The home team is on the left column; the away team is on the right column.

Friendly match

Euro 2012 qualification
The Welsh men's national team were drawn into UEFA Euro 2012 qualifying Group G.

All fixtures for this group were negotiated between the participants at a meeting in Frankfurt, Germany on 21 and 22 February 2010.

Welsh Cup

Latest Round
Round 4

|}
Quarter-finals

|}
Semi-finals

|}
Final

|}

Welsh League Cup

Final: Afan Lido 1-1 Newtown (Afan Lido won 3–2 on penalties)

Welsh Premier League

Welsh Football League First Division

 Champions: Cambrian & Clydach Vale B. & G.C.

Cymru Alliance League

References

 
Seasons in Welsh football
Welsh